The Zagwe dynasty (Ge'ez: ዛጔ ሥርወ መንግሥት) was an Agaw medieval dynasty that ruled the northern parts of Ethiopia and Eritrea, after the historical name of the Lasta province. Centered at Roha (later named Lalibela), it ruled large parts of the territory from approximately 900 to 1270 CE, when the last Zagwe King Za-Ilmaknun was killed in battle by the forces of the Amhara King Yekuno Amlak. The name of the dynasty is thought to derive from the ancient Ge'ez phrase Ze-Agaw, meaning "of the Agaw", in reference to the Mara Tekle Haymanot, the founder of the dynasty. Zagwe's best-known King was Gebre Mesqel Lalibela, who is credited with having constructed the rock-hewn monolithic churches of Lalibela.

David Buxton has stated that the areas under the direct rule of the Zagwe kings apart from the centre of power in Lasta "probably embraced the highlands of modern Eritrea, Tigray, Waag and Bete Amhara and thence westwards towards Lake Tana (Begemder)." Unlike the practice of later rulers of Ethiopia, Taddesse Tamrat argues that under the Zagwe dynasty the order of succession was that of brother succeeding brother as king, based on the Agaw laws of inheritance.

History

According to one tradition, around 960, Queen Gudit destroyed the remnants of the Kingdom of Aksum, causing a shift in its temporal power centre that later regrouped more to the south. For 40 years she ruled over what remained of the kingdom, eventually passing on the throne to her descendants, with Mara marrying the daughter of the last king of Aksum, Dil Na'od. According to other Ethiopian traditional accounts, the last of her dynasty was overthrown by Mara Takla Haymanot in 1137. Still more, according to another tradition, Mara was born in the province of Lasta, which was his power base. Originally a general of Dil Na'od, whose daughter Masoba Warq became his wife, Mara overthrew his father-in-law to found the new dynasty. James Bruce, on the other hand, presents another tradition that Dil Na'od was overthrown by Gudit, and that Mara Takla Haymanot (whom Bruce calls "Takla Haymanot") was a cousin of Gudit who succeeded her after several of her own family.

The Zagwe period is still shrouded in mystery; even the number of kings in this dynasty is disputed. Some sources (such as the Paris Chronicle, and manuscripts Bruce 88, 91, and 93) give the names of eleven kings who ruled for 354 years; others (among them the book Pedro Páez and Manuel de Almeida saw at Axum) list only five who ruled 143. Paul B. Henze reports the existence of at least one list containing 16 names.

According to Carlo Conti Rossini, the shorter mooted length of this dynasty is the more likely one. He argues that a letter received by the Patriarch of Alexandria John V shortly before 1150 from an unnamed Ethiopian monarch, in which the Patriarch is asked for a new abuna because the current office holder was too old, was from Mara Takla Haymanot, who wanted the abuna replaced because he would not endorse the new dynasty.
 
The mystery of the Zagwe dynasty is perhaps darkest around its replacement by the Solomonic dynasty under Yekuno Amlak. The name of the last Zagwe king is lost—the surviving chronicles and oral traditions give his name as Za-Ilmaknun, which is clearly a pseudonym (Taddesse Tamrat translates it as "The Unknown, the hidden one"), employed soon after his reign by the victorious Solomonic rulers in an act of damnatio memoriae. Taddesse Tamrat believes that this last ruler was actually Yetbarak. The end of the Zagwe came when Yekuno Amlak, who never personally claimed to be descendant of Dil Na'od or King Solomon, and acting under the guidance of either Saint Tekle Haymanot or Saint Iyasus Mo'a, pursued the last king of the Zagwe and killed him at the Battle of Ansata.

Foreign relations

Unlike Aksum, the Zagwe were virtually unknown to the contemporary powers of the Mediterranean. The only regular relations seem to have been maintained with Egypt and Jerusalem. Although their presence is often claimed to have been of considerable antiquity, it is only in the 11th and 12th centuries when Ethiopians are firmly attested to have lived in Egypt. A rare testament for their presence during the reign of the Zagwe is a fragmentary manuscript written in Ge'ez that was recently discovered in the Monastery of Saint Anthony, dating to the mid-12th to mid-13th centuries.

The earliest sources confirming an Ethiopian community in Jerusalem date to the second half of the 13th century. Yet it is still probable that Ethiopians had lived there before. In the late 12th century, King Lalibela's knowledge of the town was sufficient enough to have inspired him during the expansion of his capital, adopting Jerusalem's form, attributions and toponyms.

See also
Ethiopian historiography
History of Ethiopia
Kings of Axum
List of Emperors of Ethiopia

Notes

Further reading

External links
Ethiopian History
Tekeste Negash, "The Zagwe period re-interpreted: post-Aksumite Ethiopian urban culture"

 
 
Ethiopian noble families
African royal families
10th-century establishments in Africa
13th-century disestablishments in Africa
Medieval Ethiopia
States and territories established in the 10th century
Former kingdoms
Christian states